This article presents the filmography of Mexican actress Silvia Derbez.

Filmography

Cameos

Television

Film

References 
 Specific

 General

External links 
 

Actress filmographies
Mexican filmographies